The Red Telephone may refer to:

"The Red Telephone" (song), 1967 song by Love

See also 
 Moscow–Washington hotline, popularly called "the red telephone"